Fissurella peruviana, common name : the Peruvian Keyhole Limpet,  is a species of sea snail, a marine gastropod mollusk in the family Fissurellidae, the keyhole limpets.

Description
The size of an adult shell varies between 20 mm and 35 mm.

Distribution
This species occurs in the Pacific Ocean along Peru and Chile.

References

 Ramírez-Böhme [= Ramírez Boehme] J. (1974) Nuevas especies chilenas de Lucapina, Fissurella y Collisella (Mollusca, Archaeogastropoda). Boletin, Museo Nacional de Historia Natural [Santiago de Chile] 33: 15-34

External links
 Sowerby, G. B., I; Sowerby, G. B., II. (1832-1841). The conchological illustrations or, Coloured figures of all the hitherto unfigured recent shells. London, privately published
 Sowerby, G. B., I. (1835). [Characters of shells collected by Mr. Cuming on the western coast of South America, and among the islands of the South Pacific Ocean. Proceedings of the Zoological Society of London. 1834: 123–128]
  McLean J.H. (1984) Systematics of Fissurella in the Peruvian and Magellanic faunal provinces (Gastropoda: Prosobranchia). Contributions in Science, Natural History Museum of Los Angeles County 354: 1–70, p. 49. (29 October 1984) 
 

Fissurellidae
Gastropods described in 1822